Aram Avetik Sargsyan (born 5 April 1984), better known by his stage name Aram Mp3 ( Mp3; often stylized as Aram MP3), is an Armenian singer and comedian. He represented Armenia in the Eurovision Song Contest 2014 in Copenhagen with the song "Not Alone" and took the 4th place.

Early life
Aram Sargsyan was born in Armenia's capital Yerevan. Ever since he was a child, he has been involved in a number of choirs and theatrical performances. He got a bachelor's degree in pharmacy at Yerevan State Medical University, from which he graduated in 2006. During his study at the YSMU, he played in the KVN comedy show, first among Armenian universities and later in the Armenian team Ararat in Moscow.

Career

2006–2012: Early beginnings
In 2006, Aram joined several other comedians—largely unknown to the public—to form 32 Teeth (32 ատամ) comedy show. During his first years in 32 Atam he often performed humorous covers of popular songs earning the nickname "Aram Mp3", referring the common audio format MP3. One of his colleagues, Vahagn Grigoryan, gave him that pseudonym. In 2007, he became the winner of Armenian First Channel's 2 Stars (2 աստղ) TV show.

During this time Aram started to perform live in jazz and blues clubs, record songs and shoot music videos. Famous TV formats such as X-Factor, Armenian Idol, My Name Is..., Power Of 10 were hosted by him and brought him more fame. In 2010 Aram and his friends created the Vitamin Club (Վիտամին ակումբ) stand-up comedy TV show, which is broadcast by Shant TV every week. He has also hosted several shows in Armenia TV. In particular, he co-hosted the "Good Evening" program with Garik Papoyan.

2013–2014: Eurovision Song Contest 

In 2013 Aram began to work more on his musical career. He released his first solo music videos for his singles "Shine" and "If I Tried". Both songs were written by Aram himself and his friend, Garik Papoyan.

On 31 December 2013, Aram Mp3 was selected by the Public Television Company of Armenia Armenia 1 (Հ1, Armenian First Channel) to represent Armenia at the Eurovision Song Contest 2014 in Denmark. During the semi-final allocation draw on 20 January 2014 at the Copenhagen City Hall, Armenia was drawn to compete in the first half of the first semi-final on 6 May 2014. On 14 March 2014 it was announced that Aram will sing his song "Not Alone" in Copenhagen.

In the run-up to the competition, Aram criticised the Austrian performer, drag queen Conchita Wurst in remarks that were characterised as homophobic and transphobic, claiming that her lifestyle was "not natural" and that she should "eventually decide whether she is a woman or a man"; he later apologised and insisted his statements were "a joke" and had not intended to offend Wurst, though maintained that he considered homosexuality to be "unacceptable".

In the first semi-final, the producers of the show decided that Armenia would open the semi-final and perform 1st. Armenia qualified from the first semi-final and competed in the final on 10 May 2014. During the winner's press conference for the first semi-final qualifiers, Armenia was allocated to compete in the first half of the final. In the final, the producers of the show decided that Armenia would perform seventh. Aram finished the contest in 4th place with 174 points.

2014–present: After Eurovision
After Eurovision he was appearing as a guest star on many Armenian TV shows such as The Voice and X Factor.
Aram's new single "Help" was released on 7 February 2015.

In 2016, he is the speaking and singing voice of Adult Simba and also the lead singer of Circle of Life. in the Armenian version of The Lion King.

Starting in 2016, he participated as a judge and mentor on the Armenian Eurovision National final where his team was made up of Saro Gevorgyan, LUCY, Lilit Harutyunyan, and Jujo. However, they all got eliminated with LUCY placing 6th in the contest.
In February 2017, Iveta Mukuchyan and Aram Mp3 released a collaborative single together titled "Dashterov".
On 21 May, Iveta Mukuchyan announced a new traditional project with Aram MP3 called "Dashterov". The first song ("El Eghnim") of that project was released on 15 June and the second one ("Let the wind blow") was released on 22 June. In the same month, Sargsyan participated in a new project for helping all the Armenian children who suffer from cancer. Many Armenian prominent singers were also participating, such as Mihran Tsarukyan, Erik Karapetyan, Iveta Mukuchyan.

Personal life
Aram married Anna Margaryan in April 2008. Their son Arno was born in June 2011.

Discography

Singles

As lead artist

"Dashterov" collaboration

Appearance

Awards and nominations

References

Notes
A  Did not appear on the official Belgian Ultratop 50 chart, but rather on Ultratip chart, which combines "Airplay and Sales".

Sources

External links
Aram Mp3's biography

1984 births
Living people
21st-century Armenian male singers
Musicians from Yerevan
Eurovision Song Contest entrants for Armenia
Eurovision Song Contest entrants of 2014
Armenian pop singers
Armenian male film actors
Armenian comedians
Yerevan State Medical University alumni